Dean Greig (born 31 October 1968) is a former Australian rules footballer in the Australian Football League.

In 1990, Greig played for the ailing Camberwell Football Club in the Victorian Football Association. He polled ten J. J. Liston Trophy votes in only nine games, and Camberwell coach Gary Brice described Grieg's performances as the sole shining light in a winless season which turned out to be the club's last in the VFA.

Greig was subsequently recruited to the Australian Football League (to which the VFL had changed its name in 1990) by the St Kilda Football Club in 1991. On debut in Round 21, 1991, at nearly 23 years of age, he compiled a league record 39 disposals (23 kicks, 16 handballs) against Carlton, the VFL/AFL record for most ever disposals on debut.

A strongly built midfielder, he didn't progress as expected, nevertheless managed some fine games with the St Kilda and was noted for his creative handball.

In August 2001, whilst playing for Scoresby Football Club in the Eastern Football League (Australia), he suffered a broken tibia and fibula and due to the onset of compartment syndrome and infection, had his lower leg amputated.

References

External links

 Most Disposals on AFL debut 

1968 births
Living people
St Kilda Football Club players
Camberwell Football Club players
Australian rules footballers from Victoria (Australia)